Tapan Raychaudhuri (8 May 1926 – 26 November 2014) was a British-Indian historian specialising in British Indian history, Indian economic history and the History of Bengal.

Early life and education
He was the son of Prativa and Amiya Kumar Raychaudhuri, the last zamindar of Kirtipasha in Barisal district of eastern Bengal. He came from a well-known Baidya family. He was a nephew of Kiran Shankar Roy and Hem Chandra Roychaudhuri, through his paternal aunts.

He was a student of Ballygunge Government High School, Calcutta and Barisal Zilla School, Scottish Church College, Calcutta, where he completed his I.A. and finally Presidency College, Calcutta, where he completed his B.A. (Hons.) in history with a high first class. He completed his first D.Phil. in history at Calcutta University under the supervision of Sir Jadunath Sarkar, who was his Additional Supervisor and his second D.Phil. at Balliol College, Oxford, under the supervision of Major (Dr.) C.C. Davies.

Career
He started his career as a lecturer at the Department of Islamic History and Culture, Calcutta University. After his return from Britain, he became a deputy director of the National Archives of India. He was a reader and then professor of history and director of the Delhi School of Economics and professor and the head of the department of history of Delhi University.

He was a reader in modern South Asian history from 1973 to 1992 and then ad hominem professor of Indian history and civilization and fellow of St. Antony's College, Oxford, from 1992 to 1993. He was an emeritus fellow of St. Antony's College, Oxford, after retirement. He also served on the inaugural Social Sciences jury for the Infosys Prize in 2009.

He became a national research professor in India in 2011

Awards
 Watumull Prize awarded by the American Historical Association, 1982. (jointly with Irfan Habib) for the Cambridge Economic History of India.
 Doctor of Letters 1993, University of Oxford
 Doctor of Letters honoris causa by the University of Calcutta
 Doctor of Letters honoris causa by the University of Burdwan
 Padma Bhushan in 2007 in recognition to his contributions to history.

Death
He died at home in Oxford (England) on 26 November 2014, after suffering a stroke.

Publications

Books

References

1926 births
2014 deaths
People from Barisal District
20th-century Indian historians
Alumni of Balliol College, Oxford
Scottish Church College alumni
Presidency University, Kolkata alumni
Bengali historians
Bengali zamindars
Economic historians
Fellows of St Antony's College, Oxford
Harvard University staff
Historians of South Asia
Indian autobiographers
People associated with Santiniketan
Recipients of the Padma Bhushan in literature & education
Scholars from Kolkata
Academic staff of the University of Calcutta
Academic staff of Delhi University
University of California, Berkeley staff
University of Pennsylvania staff
Indian emigrants to the United Kingdom
People from Oxford
British people of Bengali descent
British autobiographers
20th-century British historians